Dhangadhi Airport  is a domestic airport located in Dhangadhi serving Kailali District, a district in Sudurpashchim Province in Nepal. Dhangadhi Airport is also a regional airport which serves the district of Sudurpashchim Province and Rara Airport of Mugu district. Some commercial helicopters are operated from Dhangadhi Airport to Khaptad National Park.

History
Dhangadhi Airport was established on 6 July 1958. In 2022, Nepal Airlines relaunched regional operations from Dhangadhi Airport making it the airline's western-most hub.

Facilities

Airlines and destinations

See also
List of airports in Nepal

References

External links
 

Airports in Nepal
Buildings and structures in Kailali District